Yang Pengfeng (born February 9, 1979, in Guangzhou) is a football commentator and former Chinese footballer. He played for Guangzhou Songri, Sichuan Guancheng and Guangzhou Pharmaceutical before ending his career with G.D. Artilheiros.

Career
Yang Pengfeng started his football career with top tier club Guangzhou Songri, however it was at Sichuan Guancheng where he established himself as a regular within the team. After several seasons Yang returned to his hometown club Guangzhou Pharmaceutical in 2006 to play in the second tier for 800,000 Yuan. Upon his return he would go on to win the division title with them and promotion into the Chinese Super League but was released by Guangzhou Pharmaceutical at the end of 2008 league season. He would end his career for Macau football club G.D. Artilheiros before moving into Futsal with the  Jiangmen team.

Yang went on to become active as a commentator, providing analysis to Guangdong sports channel for Chinese Super League, Chinese FA Cup and AFC Champions League. He is the player-manager of an amateur team, Zhaoqing Hengtai, who reached the second round in the 2014 Chinese FA Cup.

Honours
 Guangzhou Pharmaceutical
China League One: 2007

References

External links
Player profile at Sodasoccer.com

1979 births
Living people
Chinese footballers
Footballers from Guangzhou
Sichuan Guancheng players
Guangzhou F.C. players
Chinese association football commentators
Chinese Super League players
China League One players
Association football forwards